Hullen Owens was an African-American man who was lynched in Texarkana, Bowie County, Texas by a white mob on May 19, 1922. According to a 1926 report by the United States Senate Committee on the Judiciary, this was the 26th of 61 lynchings during 1922 in the United States.

Background

Texarkana is a city that developed on both sides of the state border between Texas and Arkansas. It was the site of the junction between two major railways that served the two-state region, and extended north to St. Louis, Missouri. The west of the city is in Bowie County, Texas and the east is in Miller County, Arkansas.

Hullen Owens had been arrested in Texas on May 18, 1922, for alleged car theft. He was taking police to recover some stolen items when he pulled a gun he had earlier stashed and made an escape. During the ensuing chase, he was shot in the mouth, but shot several times at the Chief of Police L. J. Lummus, also fatally wounding officer R.C. Choate. The chase ended with Owens allegedly trying to drown himself in a pool. Sheriff John Strange pulled him from the water and took him to the Miller County jail across state lines in Arkansas.

Lynching
By this time a mob of thousands of people gathered to lynch Owens for shooting at the chief and killing a white officer. Judge H.M. Barney tried to calm the enraged mob to no avail. They stormed the Miller County jail and used a battering ram to break down the jail door. They dragged Owens outside and to the Texas side of the city. There he was shot multiple times and his body was dragged behind a car through the streets. The mob took his body to the Union Depot near the intersection of First and State streets, doused is body in kerosene and lit it on fire. Some sources, however, say that he was dragged alive eight city blocks before dying of strangulation by the rope around his neck.

National memorial 

The National Memorial for Peace and Justice opened in Montgomery, Alabama, on April 26, 2018. It is devoted to telling the history of lynchings in the United States and memorializing the victims. Among its exhibits is the Memorial Corridor. Here hang 805 steel rectangles, each representing a county in the United States where a documented lynching took place. On each rectangle is incised the names of those lynched in that county. Copies of the rectangles are available, in the hopes that communities such as Texarkana, which were sites of lynchings, will install them as memorials for awareness. Another exhibit has jars full of dirt, taken from those counties where documented lynchings took place.

See also
Lynching of Mr Norman

References 
Notes

Bibliography

1922 riots
1922 in Texas
African-American history of Texas
Lynching deaths in Texas 
February 1922 events
Protest-related deaths
Racially motivated violence against African Americans 
Riots and civil disorder in Texas 
White American riots in the United States